Lieutenant-Colonel Sir Hugh Stephenson Turnbull  (25 August 1882 – 9 January 1973) was a British Army officer and senior police officer. His army commands included 2/7th Battalion Gordon Highlanders. He served as Commissioner of the City of London Police from 1925 to April 1950.

He is the father of Lt. Col. John Turnbull, who was awarded the Military Cross for his engagement in Tunisia.

References

Commissioners of the City of London Police
Gordon Highlanders officers
Knights Commander of the Royal Victorian Order
Knights Commander of the Order of the British Empire
Scottish recipients of the Queen's Police Medal
1882 births
1973 deaths
People educated at Merchiston Castle School
Graduates of the Royal Military College, Sandhurst
Royal Irish Constabulary officers
British Chief Constables
Argyll and Sutherland Highlanders officers
British Army personnel of World War I
Members of the Royal Company of Archers
British Indian Army officers